Myelois fuscicostella is a species of snout moth. It is found in Spain, Portugal, Algeria and Kazakhstan.

References

Moths described in 1861
Phycitini
Insects of Turkey